DWBL (91.9 FM), broadcasting as 91.9 Bright FM, is a radio station owned and operated by the Roman Catholic Archdiocese of San Fernando. Its studio and transmitter are located at the 4th Floor, DSF Building, Gen. Hizon Avenue, San Fernando, Pampanga.

It was formerly owned by Bright Light Broadcasting Service until September 7, 2015, when it was acquired by the Archdiocese of San Fernando. It is currently a member of the Catholic Media Network.

References

Radio stations in Pampanga
Christian radio stations in the Philippines
Radio stations established in 2010